Kresna is a town and the seat of Kresna Municipality in Blagoevgrad Province in Bulgaria.

It is located in the southwestern part of Bulgaria.

History 
The archaeological findings found testify that the area has been inhabited since ancient times.

In 1878 the Kresna - Razlog uprising was ingnited with the mission to free Macedonia from the Ottoman yoke. One year later (1879)  the uprising ends with a loss for Kresna's citizens. 

Since 1932, the Probuda Community Center has been operating in Kriva livada (Kresna).

The settlement was established after 1926 as Pirin Station. It was recognized as a station settlement without an administrative act in 1934. In 1956, the population of Novo Selo was counted together with the population of Pirin Station. In 1959, the town of Kriva livada was added to Pirin Station by Decree No. 582/obn. 29.12.1959 By Decree No. 1582/obn. On September 29, 1978, it was declared a city and renamed to Kresna, and the former village of Kresna to Stara Kresna.

Geography
The municipality of Kresna (7,560 inhabitants) covers parts of the valley of the Struma River with the picturesque Kresna gorge, the western branches of Pirin and the northeastern slopes of the Maleshev mountain. The area is attractive with its uniqueness and natural beauty.

The town of Kresna (4,600 inhabitants) is located on both sides of the international road E-79. Before the city, at a picturesque bend of the Struma river, there is a monument to those who died in the Kresnensko-Razlozhko Uprising (1878). Passers-by are impressed by the temple-monument "St. Ivan Rilski" (on the right of the road), the pleasant center and the Melo sand screes, which rise like a giant fan in the east-northeast, and in the background - the majestic ridge of Pirin

In Pirin is located the beautiful resort area of Sinanitsa (Blue Peak), through which the popular hiking route to the hut and lake of the same name passes, one of the most beautiful in Pirin. The village of Vlahi conquers the visitor with its incredible nature and pastoral idyll. Near Vlahi, in the village of Oshtava and in the area of Gradeshka Banya, there are mineral springs known for their healing properties. In the Maleshevska Planina, along the valley of the Breznishka River, is the kingdom of ancient plane trees. On the hill above the village of Breznitsa, on the site of an old monastery, the "Holy Prophet Elijah" monastery was built.

The remains of the ancient city of Neine (near the village of Dolna Gradeshnitsa) and of the medieval monastery "St. St. Cosmas and Damian" (near the village of Vlahi) speak of the centuries-old history of the area. In each of the settlements in the municipality there are interesting churches to visit. The oldest, "Nativity of the Virgin", is in the village of Vlahi and dates back to 1750.

On both sides of the Struma is the "Tisata" reserve - the largest juniper forest on the Balkan Peninsula, which is home to over a hundred species of birds. Ornithologists, lovers of mountain routes, fishermen and guests - all are welcome in Kresna, where the local people welcome them with hospitality and warmth.

Religion 
The population professes Eastern Orthodoxy. In 1941, the church "St. Ivan Rilski" was built in Kresna.

Transportation
Kresna lies on the route E79, which leads from Sofia to the Greek border.

Namesakes
Kresna Gully on Livingston Island in the South Shetland Islands, Antarctica is named after Kresna.

Towns in Bulgaria
Populated places in Blagoevgrad Province